The Story of Tấm and Cám commonly known as Tấm Cám (Chữ Nôm: 糝𥽇) is an ancient Vietnamese fairy tale. The first part of the tale's plot is very similar to the European folk tale Cinderella.

Plot

Tấm's life before she marries the king 
The story is about two half-sisters; the eldest is named Tam (broken rice) and the youngest is named Cam (rice bran). Tam's mother dies early and her father remarries before dying soon after. Tam lives with her stepmother, who is Cam's mother. The stepmother is very sadistic and makes Tam do all the housework, whereas Cam does not have to do anything.

One day, the stepmother tells Tam and Cam to go to the field to catch "tép" (caridina, a tropical genus of shrimp) and promises to give them a new red yếm (a Vietnamese traditional bodice) to whoever catches the most. Tam soon fills up her basket, while Cam plays in the water and catches nothing. Realizing that her sister actually had a chance at receiving a red yếm and the day is almost done, Cám comes up with a plan to sabotage Tam's work. Cam tells her older sister to wash her hair, saying that the stepmother will scold her if her hair is so muddy after catching all the caridinas, and Tam obeys. While Tam is washing her hair, Cam transfers all the shrimp from Tam's basket to hers and goes home.

When Tam realizes that all the shrimp she has caught is gone, she cries in seeing all her hard work disappear and the impending punishment that will come from her stepmother. Bụt (a wise old man who helps pitiful people in Vietnamese folklore, sometimes considered a tiên) appears and asks why she cries, and she tells him what happened. He tells her to stop crying and see what is left in the basket, which is merely a goby. Then he tells her to raise the fish in a well with her rice and teach her the words to call the fish up:

Without the exact recitement, the goby would not rise, according to what the old man has said before he vanishes. Tam follows his counsel, and the goby grows noticeably. Tam would spend her time talking to the goby about her thoughts, which the fish would silently comfort her. Suspicious about her behavior, the stepmother and the half-sister discover the fish as well as the poem by which Tấm summons it. The stepmother plans to distance Tam in order to kill the fish:

The stepmother also tells Tam to leave her coat behind. Tam obeys her stepmother, unaware of her intent. The stepmother has Cam wear Tam's clothes and recite the line, making the goby mistaken her as Tam, which allows them to butcher the goby.

After coming back home, Tam calls the goby up as usual, but nothing goes up but blood. She sobs again and the old man appears again. He asks why she cries and she explains. He replies: "Your goby they have eaten. Cry no more! Collect its bones, put them in four jars and bury them under your bed legs.", and she does so.

Soon after, the king hosts a festival, which he invites people from everywhere to attend, including Tam and her family. Noticing that Tam also wants to join, the stepmother mixes up the rice and bran that Tam has to separate them before joining the festival, and threatens to punish her if she does not have it done by the time they get back from the festival. Again she cries, but then the old man reappears and she explains what happened. He calls sparrows down to help her and teaches her a poem to prevent them from eating the bran and rice:

The old man then tells her to dig up those jars that she had buried previously. The first two jars includes silk clothes, a scarf, and a red yếm. The third jar contains a tiny horse which enlarges into a normal horse; the fourth has a saddle for the horse.

Happily, Tam washes up and wears the clothing before rushing to the festival in the capital. Crossing a stone bridge, she drops a slipper and cannot get it back. When the king crosses the same bridge, the elephant on which the king rides suddenly growls and brushes its ivory down to the earth. Curiously, the king commands his men to look underwater, and they find the slipper. He observes the slipper for a while and comments that the shoe must belong to a gracious woman. Saying so, he tells all the women in the festival to try the slipper to find out the owner, whom he shall wed. No one fits the shoe. Tam arrives, excited about the festivities and notices her slipper on display. She approaches to try it on. Seeing Tam trying it on, Cam and her mother mock her. The slipper turns out to fit her, and she draws the other one to wear. The king commands his people to lead her to his palace to wed her. Tam goes with the king in front of Cam's and her mother's envious eyes.

Tam's Reincarnations 
Tam and the king are happily married. Not forgetting her father's death day, despite the fulfilling life in the king's palace, she comes back home to help her stepmother prepare for the anniversary.

All the hatred the stepmother and Cam have towards Tam rises again, but they kept their thoughts private. Despite their harsh treatment towards her before she was married, Tam treats them kindly during the anniversary.

The stepmother tells Tam to climb on an areca tree to gather its fruit for the ceremony. While Tam is doing so, the stepmother chops down the tree, causing Tam to fall down and die.

The stepmother takes Tam's clothes for Cam to wear. Cam goes to the king's palace and lies to him that Tam had unfortunately drowned in a pond by accident. Cam states she came to the palace to replace her sister's position as his wife. The king is saddened to hear so, but with no other choice he marries Cam. He ignores his new wife, mourning for Tam silently, to the other's dismay.

Tam reincarnates into an oriole. She flies straight to the king. On her way, she scolds Cam for not properly washing the king's clothes. Eventually, Tam sees the king, and she sings to him.

Missing his wife, the king says: "O oriole, if you are my wife, enter my sleeve", and she does so. The king immediately believes that she has been reincarnated as the bird and only spends his time with it, ignoring Cam even more. He then builds a cage for Tam to reside in when they are not together.

Following her mother's counsel, Cam butchers the oriole, eats it, and then buries its feather in the royal garden. She lies to the king that she was not aware of the interaction between him and the bird, and the oriole simply flew away when she tried to feed it.

From where the feathers were buried grow two peach trees. The trees bend itself to provide shade for the king. Noticing the two trees that somehow appeared in the royal garden, the king believes they are also a sign from Tam.

The king tells his people to bring a cot so he can nap there every day. Cam chops the trees down and tells the king she did so to weave new clothes for him. While weaving the clothes, she hears Tam accusing her for stealing her husband, cursing her and threatening to "hack her eyes". She then burns the loom and throw the ash far away from the palace. The wind carries the ashes far away before they eventually land. From the ash grows a golden apple tree.

A crone soon crosses by the tree and is enticed by the scent of its only fruit. The old woman says:

The crone keeps her word and places it in her house as if it were a house decor. She soon notices that the housework was finished, and a meal was prepared for her as well. The next day she pretends to leave, and finds a woman, Tam, appear from the apple. The crone then tears off the peel of the fruit when Tam exits the apple, and she makes Tam her adopted daughter.

One day, the king comes across the crone's house and stops to rest. She offers the king betel leaf. It was prepared the same style Tam did when she was alive, so the king suspects. He asks who made it; the old woman tells him that her daughter did. The king demands to see the "daughter" and Tam appears. The king gladly brings Tam back to the palace.

Revenge 
Later, when Tam has returned to the palace, Cam asks Tam about her beauty secret. Tam does not answer, but instead asks back: "Do you want to be beautiful? I'll help you!"

Cam immediately agrees. Tam tells her to jump down a hole and she does so. Tam then commands the royal soldiers to pour boiling water onto her, killing Cam and using her corpse to make a fermented sauce (in the same way fish sauce is made). Tam then sends the sauce to her stepmother, saying it is a gift from Cam.

The stepmother believes so and eats it every day. One day, a crow flies by the stepmother's house and rests on her roof and cries out:

The stepmother becomes angry, but, when she finally reaches the bottom of the jar, she discovers a skull inside. Realizing it is Cam's, the stepmother immediately dies of shock.

Variations 
Variations of the story exist but still maintain the main points.

Some versions of the story implies that Cám is also involved in abusing Tấm while others suggest that Cám is indifferent about her mother's abusive nature towards her half-sister.

There are also some versions where the step-mother and Cám are eating the goby when Tấm arrives home and the two laugh when Tấm's realizes who they were eating.

Other versions have the Bụt tell Tấm that she must return her silk clothes, shoes and horse once she returns home, so that her goby will come back to life. At the festival, her stepmother and Cám notice her and Tấm immediately flees in fear. She quickly rides back home, losing her slipper in the process. Upon returning home and changing back into her normal clothes, she discovers that one of her slippers is missing and begins to mourn for the loss of her friend. She walks outside and cries herself to exhaustion, clinging onto a nearby tree. Her stepmother and Cám make it back home to see her sleeping next to the tree. Thinking that she simply fell asleep from exhaustion and assured that they actually didn't see Tấm at the festival, the two returned to the festivities. The king and his court were on the way to the festival when he discovers the shoe. Variations that have this change will have the King set up a place to display the missing shoe for all the maidens in the country to try on, and ordered the guards to notify him of anyone who can fit it. Eventually, the King grows impatient about the search and he himself joins the guards on watch. Tấm, believing that the shoe is the one she was missing, sneaks into the night and takes the shoe away so that she can compare it to the one she has in her possession at home. The guards, who were watching the shoe with the king at the time, initially wanted to arrest her for theft, but the king caught a glimpse of her face and immediately fell in love with her beauty. He commands his guard to silently follow Tấm home with him to see what she is doing with the shoe. As Tấm was able to confirm that the shoe she took was her missing pair, the king finally made himself known by entering her home. Despite being in his presence and the stepmother and Cám beginning to scold the girl for causing enough trouble to bring guards, the king speaks gently to Tấm and explains why he is at her home. He becomes enamored as he realizes that she is more beautiful up close. Tấm too is enamored by the king and his gentleness. She then reveals the shoe she took and the pair she had, trying both on, and proves that she is the true owner of the slipper.

In some versions of the death anniversary, the stepmother and Cám tell Tấm that they are unable to get the palm fruit; the stepmother claims she is too old and Cám is not able to climb well. Tấm volunteers to gather the fruits for them. Some versions have both the stepmother and Cám arrive at the palace after her death, explaining to the king that Tấm suggested the idea of her half-sister marrying him before she died.

One variation has the crone live in the royal palace with Tấm and becomes respected as Tấm's own mother.

For revenge, in some versions, Tấm tells her sister to bathe in boiling water, and Cám's vanity blinds her from reason.

In some variations, the stepmother and Cám died out of anger when Tấm comes back instead the stepmother eating Cám's remains. Some children-friendly versions of the story omit the revenge from the story or even end the story at Tấm marrying the king.

Comparison 
The story's plot is very similar to the typical plot of many Cinderella variations. Up until Tấm marries the king, the story coincides with Cinderella's plot. Examples include both of them being mistreated by stepmothers, prohibited from going to a festival/party/ball with their stepmothers forcing them to separate grains, and recognized by the king/prince by their lost shoe. The use of transformation and reincarnation are also shown in other variations of Cinderella such as The Juniper Tree.

Unlike some versions of Cinderella, Cám is never implied to be ugly. Cám is either portrayed as beautiful like her sister, though lacking in qualities like grace and being hardworking, or simply plainer than Tấm.

In popular culture 
Many Vietnamese YouTubers or advertisers reference or create parodies of the fairytale. A movie adaptation of the story named Tam Cam: the Untold Story was produced by Ngô Thanh Vân and released in Vietnam on 19 August 2016. The movie's theme song, Bống bống bang bang also amassed hundreds of millions views on Youtube.

See also
 Kongjwi and Patjwi
 Bawang Merah Bawang Putih
 Beauty and Pock Face
 Cinderella
 Sweetheart Roland
 The Boys with the Golden Stars
 The Juniper Tree
 Ye Xian

References

Further reading
 Bui, Tran Quynh Ngoc. "Structure and Motif in the ‘Innocent Persecuted Heroine’ Tale in Vietnam and Other Southeast Asian Countries". In: International Research in Children's Literature, Volume 2 Issue 1 (2008). pp. 36–48. . https://doi.org/10.3366/E1755619809000477

External links
 [http://www.furorteutonicus.eu/germanic/ashliman/mirror/tam2.html Tam and Cam]

Vietnamese fairy tales
Fiction about shapeshifting
Fictional queens
Fictional kings
ATU 500-559